Greatest Hits & Remixes is the fourth greatest hits album by Swedish Eurodance singer Pandora. It features tracks from Pandora's first two studio album, One of a Kind and Tell the World. The album was released worldwide in September 2005.

The album includes four Swedish top ten and six Finnish top ten singles.

Track listing 
 "Trust Me" – 3:25
 "Come On And Do It" – 3:18
 "One of a Kind" – 3:38
 "Something's Gone"  (Ragga Dance Cut)  – 4:06
 "Tell the World" – 3:41
 "Don't You Know" – 3:51
 "The Naked Sun" – 4:00
 "One of Us"  (Radio edit)  – 3:59
 "Trust Me" (Deeply Short mix) - 3:50
 "Come On And Do It" (The Funky Ride Version II) – 4:14
 "One of a Kind" (Naked Eye remix) – 4:32
 "Tell the World" (Birch'N'Chris remix) - 6:15
 "The Naked Sun" (The Beduin House Camp) - 4:18
 "Don't You Know" (Clock's Ten to Two Radio mix) – 3:23
 "Don't You Know" (Man City Vocal) - 6:56
 "Come On and Do It" (Rhythm Takes Control mix) - 6:00
 "Something's Gone" (Orbital Trance edit) -3:44
 "Something's Gone" (Original version) - 4:45

Release history

References 

Pandora (singer) albums
2005 compilation albums
2005 remix albums
Compilation albums by Swedish artists